John Roberson IV (born October 28, 1988) is an American-born naturalized Bosnian professional basketball player for Manisa BB of the Turkish Basketbol Süper Ligi.

Professional career
In June 2015, Roberson signed with Élan Chalon. After his first season, Roberson extended his contract until 2017. On March 8, 2017, Roberson set a new FIBA Europe Cup scoring record with 39 points in an 87–85 loss against Cibona. Roberson also set the league record for most three-point field goals in a game, with 10 three-point field goals. With Chalon he won the French League's 2016–17 season championship.

On June 27, 2017, Roberson signed a two-year contract with the French team ASVEL.

On July 17, 2018, Roberson signed with the Russian team Enisey of the VTB United League.

On July 16, 2019, Roberson signed with the South East Melbourne Phoenix of the Australian National Basketball League (NBL) for the 2019–20 season. He averaged 20.2 points and 5.5 rebounds per game. His 112 three-point field goals set an NBL record for the 40-minute era.

On February 5, 2020, Roberson signed with Galatasaray Doğa Sigorta of the Basketbol Süper Ligi (BSL).

On July 14, 2020, Roberson signed with CB Estudiantes of the Liga ACB.

On August 20, 2021, he has signed with SIG Strasbourg of the French LNB Pro A.

On June 30, 2022, he signed with Manisa BB of the Turkish Basketbol Süper Ligi.

References

External links
 John Roberson at lnb.fr
 John Roberson at realgm.com
 "John Roberson: More Than a Shooter" at nbl.com.au

1988 births
Living people
American expatriate basketball people in Australia
American expatriate basketball people in France
American expatriate basketball people in Hungary
American expatriate basketball people in Russia
American expatriate basketball people in Slovenia
American expatriate basketball people in Spain
American expatriate basketball people in Sweden
American expatriate basketball people in Switzerland
American expatriate basketball people in Turkey
American men's basketball players
ASVEL Basket players
Atomerőmű SE players
Basketball players from Kansas
BBC Monthey players
BC Enisey players
Bosnia and Herzegovina men's basketball players
Bosnia and Herzegovina people of American descent
CB Estudiantes players
Élan Chalon players
Galatasaray S.K. (men's basketball) players
KK Zlatorog Laško players
Liga ACB players
Naturalized citizens of Bosnia and Herzegovina
Point guards
SIG Basket players
Södertälje Kings players
South East Melbourne Phoenix players
Sportspeople from Kansas City, Kansas
Texas Tech Red Raiders basketball players